Rhinoscapha is a genus of true weevil family.

List of species
 Rhinoscapha aequata
 Rhinoscapha albaria
 Rhinoscapha albertisi
 Rhinoscapha albipennis
 Rhinoscapha alboguttata
 Rhinoscapha alboplagiatus
 Rhinoscapha alma
 Rhinoscapha amicta
 Rhinoscapha angusta
 Rhinoscapha arrogans
 Rhinoscapha aspersa
 Rhinoscapha aulica
 Rhinoscapha axillaris
 Rhinoscapha azureipes
 Rhinoscapha basilica
 Rhinoscapha batjanensis
 Rhinoscapha beccarii
 Rhinoscapha bicincta
 Rhinoscapha bifasciata
 Rhinoscapha biundulata
 Rhinoscapha bonthaina
 Rhinoscapha bucana
 Rhinoscapha canescens
 Rhinoscapha carinata
 Rhinoscapha chlora
 Rhinoscapha chloropunctata
 Rhinoscapha chrysochlora
 Rhinoscapha cincta
 Rhinoscapha cinnamomea
 Rhinoscapha cobaltinata
 Rhinoscapha consueta
 Rhinoscapha cristovallensis
 Rhinoscapha cruenta
 Rhinoscapha darnleyensis
 Rhinoscapha demissa
 Rhinoscapha diluta
 Rhinoscapha dohrni
 Rhinoscapha dolosa
 Rhinoscapha doriai
 Rhinoscapha douei
 Rhinoscapha dubia
 Rhinoscapha egregia
 Rhinoscapha eluta
 Rhinoscapha evanida

 Rhinoscapha fabriciusi
 Rhinoscapha fausti
 Rhinoscapha fenestrata
 Rhinoscapha formosa
 Rhinoscapha foveolata
 Rhinoscapha funebris
 Rhinoscapha gagatina
 Rhinoscapha ganglbaueri
 Rhinoscapha gebehiana
 Rhinoscapha gemmans
 Rhinoscapha generosa
 Rhinoscapha gestroi
 Rhinoscapha hasterti
 Rhinoscapha hedigeri
 Rhinoscapha heurni
 Rhinoscapha heydeni
 Rhinoscapha humboldtiana
 Rhinoscapha iligana
 Rhinoscapha immaculata
 Rhinoscapha imperfecta
 Rhinoscapha impexa
 Rhinoscapha insignis
 Rhinoscapha integrirostris
 Rhinoscapha intermedia
 Rhinoscapha interrupta
 Rhinoscapha jordani
 Rhinoscapha laevior
 Rhinoscapha lagopyga
 Rhinoscapha lamasonga
 Rhinoscapha lameerei
 Rhinoscapha lapeyrousei
 Rhinoscapha leguilloui
 Rhinoscapha leochroma
 Rhinoscapha litoralis
 Rhinoscapha loriai
 Rhinoscapha lunulata
 Rhinoscapha maclayi
 Rhinoscapha margaritifera
 Rhinoscapha meridiana
 Rhinoscapha merrillei
 Rhinoscapha miliaris
 Rhinoscapha neglecta
 Rhinoscapha nitidifrons
 Rhinoscapha oblita
 Rhinoscapha obsidiana
 Rhinoscapha opalescens
 Rhinoscapha papei
 Rhinoscapha pauperula
 Rhinoscapha perfecta
 Rhinoscapha perversa
 Rhinoscapha plagiata
 Rhinoscapha plicata
 Rhinoscapha primitiva
 Rhinoscapha pulicaria
 Rhinoscapha pulverulenta
 Rhinoscapha ribbei
 Rhinoscapha richteri
 Rhinoscapha roseipes
 Rhinoscapha roseiventris
 Rhinoscapha rothschildi
 Rhinoscapha rufithorax
 Rhinoscapha sanguinicollis
 Rhinoscapha scalaris
 Rhinoscapha schmeltzi
 Rhinoscapha sellata
 Rhinoscapha simplex
 Rhinoscapha sordida
 Rhinoscapha staintoni
 Rhinoscapha staudingeri
 Rhinoscapha stolifera
 Rhinoscapha striatopunctata
 Rhinoscapha stridulatoria
 Rhinoscapha subhumeralis
 Rhinoscapha suturalis
 Rhinoscapha thomsoni
 Rhinoscapha tricolor
 Rhinoscapha tuberculata
 Rhinoscapha uniformis
 Rhinoscapha usta
 Rhinoscapha vana
 Rhinoscapha verrucosa
 Rhinoscapha vibrans
 Rhinoscapha vilis
 Rhinoscapha viridans
 Rhinoscapha viridisparsa
 Rhinoscapha viridula
 Rhinoscapha vollenhoveni
 Rhinoscapha vormanni
 Rhinoscapha wichmanni
 Rhinoscapha x-album
 Rhinoscapha zonata

References 

 Zipcodezoo
 Biolib

 
Entiminae